Astra Digital Radio (ADR) was a system used by SES for digital radio transmissions on the early Astra satellites, using the audio subcarrier frequencies of analogue television channels. It was introduced in 1995. As of February 2008, there were still 51 stations transmitting in this format. ADR ceased on 30 April 2012 when analogue broadcasts on Astra 19.2°E ended.

Details
The format used one mono audio subcarrier, which was normally allocated to an additional audio track or radio station, or one channel of a stereo audio track/station. The carrier was digitally modulated and carried a 192 kbit/s, 48 kHz sampled MPEG-1 Layer II (MP2) encoded signal. 9.6 kbit/s was available for data.

Special receivers were required to listen to ADR stations, although some combined analogue/digital satellite boxes and later standard analogue boxes were equipped to decode it.

ADR was succeeded by DVB-S, with which it is incompatible, despite both being transmitted using MP2 and generally at the same bitrates. As a result, when the final analogue switch-off on the Astra 1 satellites occurred, ADR became obsolete.

The majority of the channels to have been broadcast using ADR were in the German language. Because of this, the system can in a way be seen to have replaced the German Digitales Satellitenradio system, dating from the 1980s, which used an entire satellite transponder to carry 16 NICAM encoded radio stations, and which closed in 1999.

Channel Listing
DLF
DKultur
Deutsche Welle
Bayerischer Rundfunk
Bayern 1
Bayern 2
Bayern 3
BR Klassik
B5 plus
Hessischer Rundfunk
You FM
hr1
hr2
hr3
hr4
hr-info
hr1 plus
Hr-klassik
Mitteldeutscher Rundfunk
MDR Figaro
MDR Info
MDR Jump
MDR Sputnik
Norddeutscher Rundfunk
N-Joy
NDR 2
NDR Info
NDR Info Spezial
NDR Kultur
Südwestrundfunk
DASDING
SWR1 BW
SWR1 RP
SWR2 BW
SWR2 RP
SWR3
SWR Cont.Ra
SWR4 BW
SWR4 RP
Westdeutscher Rundfunk
COSMO (German radio station)
WDR 2
WDR 3
WDR 4
WDR 5
1LIVE
KIRAKA
VeRa
Radio BOB
 Radio Bremen 
 Bremen Eins
 Bremen Zwei 
 Bremen Vier
 Saarländischer Rundfunk 
 SR 1 Europawelle 
 Rundfunk Berlin-Brandenburg
 Antenne Brandenburg
 radioBERLIN 88,8
 Inforadio
 Kulturradio
 Fritz
 radioeins
 Swiss Broadcasting Corporation
Radio SRF 1
Radio SRF 2 Kultur
Radio SRF Musikwelle
Radio SRF Virus
La Première (Switzerland)
Option Musique
Couleur 3
 RSI Rete Uno
 Radiotelevisiun Svizra Rumantscha

References

External links
 SES - Official SES site
 SES fleet information
 Astra Digital Radio on the early Astra satellites 

SES S.A.
Digital radio
Satellite radio
Telecommunications-related introductions in 1995
Audiovisual introductions in 1995
1995 establishments in Germany
1995 establishments in Luxembourg
Products and services discontinued in 2012
2012 disestablishments in Germany
2012 disestablishments in Luxembourg